K. J. George (1934 – 20 March 2020) was an Indian politician. He joined the Indian National Congress in 1955, and remained active in Indian National Congress (Organisation) until its merger into the Janata Party. George was elected to the Kerala Legislative Assembly for the first time in 1977 under the Janata Party banner. During his first term as a legislator, George represented Thrissur. He contested the Chalakudy seat in the 1987 and 1991 legislative assembly elections, and won both. George retired from politics in 2011, and died on 20 March 2020, aged 85.

References

1934 births
2020 deaths
Kerala MLAs 1977–1979
Kerala MLAs 1987–1991
Kerala MLAs 1991–1996
Indian National Congress politicians
Indian National Congress politicians from Kerala
Indian National Congress (Organisation) politicians
Janata Party politicians
Bharatiya Lok Dal politicians